Jesús Misael Vázquez Delgadillo (born 23 October 1994) is a Mexican professional footballer who plays as a midfielder.

Career

Club
Vázquez signed with Universidad de Guadalajara after having played in their youth system.

Vázquez played and graduated from Wallis Annenberg High School.

He played with Los Cabos of the Liga de Balompié Mexicano during the league's inaugural season in 2020–21, subsequently joining Dorados de Sinaloa.

References

External links

1994 births
Living people
Association football midfielders
Leones Negros UdeG footballers
Dorados de Sinaloa footballers
Liga MX players
Ascenso MX players
Liga de Expansión MX players
Liga de Balompié Mexicano players
Footballers from Sonora
People from Puerto Peñasco
Mexican footballers